The Black Tower is a medieval tower in central Brussels, Belgium. It is one of the best preserved remains of the first fortifications of Brussels, built at the start of the 13th century. It is notable for being a single medieval tower surrounded by modern-day buildings. This odd sight has made it a popular tourist destination.

The Black Tower is located on the /, behind Saint Catherine's Church, and not far from the Boulevard Anspach/Anspachlaan and the Place de Brouckère/De Brouckèreplein. This site is served by the metro stations Sainte-Catherine/Sint-Katelijne and De Brouckère on lines 1 and 5.

History
The Black Tower was built in the early 13th century, as part of the first fortifications of Brussels. When the city's second fortifications were built at the end of the 14th century, its original function became obsolete. Historians believe it had by then become private property. This would explain why it survived so many centuries unharmed.

In the 16th century, unlike other sections of the wall, the tower survived the creation of a new dock for the inland port of Brussels, on the site where Saint Catherine's Church is now located. Around the same time, it was transformed into a tavern named In the Tower. In 1888, when the entire street was sanitised, the city's then-mayor, Charles Buls, saved the tower from demolition. The architect  restored the building and reconstructed the gable and the roof, as well as the bent radius. In the 19th century, it was surrounded by a clothing store.

On 1 February 1937, the tower officially became a state's building and was classified as a historical monument. Nowadays, it is surrounded by a hotel with modern-day supplies. A plaque reminds passers-by of its historical importance.

In popular culture
The tower is subject of an album in the Belgian comic book series The Adventures of Nero by Marc Sleen. In the story De Zwarte Toren ("The Black Tower") (1983), Nero visits Brussels and discovers mysterious things going on in the Black Tower. Based on this story the proprietors of the Marc Sleen Museum made it part of a special Nero route, which takes visitors to several parts of Brussels that play an important role in certain Nero albums.

See also

 Anneessens Tower, another part of the 13th-century city wall protecting Brussels
 Villers Tower, also named St. James Tower, another tower in the 13th-century city wall in Brussels
 History of Brussels
 Belgium in "the long nineteenth century"

References

Notes

Bibliography
 

Brussels
City of Brussels
Protected heritage sites in Brussels
Tourist attractions in Brussels
Buildings and structures in Brussels
History of Brussels
Buildings and structures completed in the 13th century